Carenum foveolatum is a species of ground beetle in the subfamily Scaritinae, found in Australia. It was described by William John Macleay in 1888.

References

foveolatum
Beetles described in 1888